Talawa gosht (تلا ہوا گوشت; Urdu for fried meat) is a Hyderabadi dish. It is a very simple meat preparation with lamb or beef and basic flavorings originating from Hyderabad, India. It is usually prepared with Mithi Dal or Khatti Dal, and is eaten with rice.

The proper Urdu name is Talaa-wa-Gosh. It is shortened to Talawa Gosht in the Hyderabadi Urdu dialect.

See also

References

Telangana cuisine
Hyderabadi cuisine
Indian meat dishes
Muhajir cuisine